Prafulla Mullick (1919–1974) was an Indian swimmer. He competed in the men's 200 metre breaststroke at the 1948 Summer Olympics.

References

External links
 

1919 births
1974 deaths
Sportspeople from Kolkata
Indian male swimmers
Olympic swimmers of India
Swimmers at the 1948 Summer Olympics
Place of birth missing
Date of birth missing
Male breaststroke swimmers
20th-century Indian people